István Ordódy de Ordód et Alsólieszkó was a Hungarian influential lord, vice-palatine of Hungary in the 17th century.

References 

17th-century Hungarian people